William H. Clifford (died October 9, 1938) was a writer, director, and film company head during the silent film era. He was a production manager for Monogram Film Company. He worked for Marcus Loew and Thomas Ince.

He was born in Washington D.C. and wrote vaudeville sketches before linking up with film producer Thomas Ince. Clifford wrote stories for the Famous Players studio before coming to California. He organized his own studio in 1917.

Victor Kremer managed his W. H. Clifford Photoplay Company film production business. It produced several Shorty Hamilton westerns and planned to produce more. It was located in Los Angeles.

Clifford wrote the scenarios for the studio's films.

Theater
Trapping Santa Claus (1912), a vaudeville act
Mr. Aladdin (1914), written with Thomas H. Ince

Partial filmography
The Ranger (in five parts) starting Shorty Hamilton. 
The Snail (1918) the second offering from the W. H. Clifford Photoplay Company.
The Pen Vulture (1918), writer and director. This was the fourth in the Shorty Hamilton series from the W. H. Clifford Photoplay Company.
Denny from Ireland (1918), director
Man Alone (1923)
Souls in Bondage (1923)
Missing Daughters (1924)

References

External links 
 

American film directors
1938 deaths
Year of birth missing
American screenwriters